Péter Krempels (17 September 1897 — February 1978) was a Hungarian ice hockey player. He played for the Hungarian national team at the 1928 Winter Olympics.

References

External links
 

1897 births
1978 deaths
Hungarian ice hockey forwards
Ice hockey players at the 1928 Winter Olympics
Olympic ice hockey players of Hungary
Ice hockey people from Budapest